Lancelot Lumsden (30 October 1939 – 18 June 2011) was a Jamaican former professional tennis player.

Biography
Born in Buff Bay, Lumsden played collegiate tennis in the United States at Southern Illinois University Carbondale in the early 1960s. He went on to compete on the international circuit and featured in the main draws of all four grand slam tournaments, which included a match up against number one seed Rod Laver at the 1968 French Open.

Lumsden was a Davis Cup representative for the Caribbean/West Indies and appeared in a total of seven ties. Four of those came against the United States and he twice faced Arthur Ashe in singles. His most famous win came against Ashe in doubles, when the Caribbean/West Indies hosted the Americans in Kingston in 1966. He and Richard Russell teamed up to defeat Ashe and Charlie Pasarell in five sets. This was one of only two Davis Cup doubles rubbers which Ashe ever played and his only loss.

For much of his life post tennis he lived in the Austrian capital Vienna, where he married Austrian journalist Chris Lohner. At the time of his death in 2011 he was living back in Jamaica.

References

External links
 
 
 

1939 births
2011 deaths
Jamaican male tennis players
Southern Illinois Salukis athletes
People from Portland Parish
Jamaican expatriates in the United States
Tennis players at the 1967 Pan American Games
Pan American Games competitors for Jamaica
College men's tennis players in the United States